Olivia Zechner (born 29 November 1981) is an Austrian ultralight pilot who won the European Championship in 2002 in Hungary and was second in the World Championships 2003 in England. As part of the Austrian team she also won Bronze in Hungary, 2002.

References

External links 
 FAI website 
 9th World Microlight Championships
  http://www.sunflightcraft.com

Austrian aviators
1981 births
Living people